Tokyo '96 is a live album by American pianist Keith Jarrett's "Standards Trio" featuring Gary Peacock and Jack DeJohnette recorded in concert in March, 1996 at the Bunkamura Orchard Hall in Shibuya, Tokyo (Japan) and released on the ECM label in 1998.  Filmed footage of the concert was originally released as Trio Concert 1996 (by Image Entertainment in VHS and DVD formats).

To celebrate the 25th anniversary of the Standards Trio in 2008, ECM Records acquired rights to the filmed performance and released a double-DVD set called Live In Japan 93/96, which featured Trio Concert 1996 and another Trio film, Live at Open Theater East.

March–April 1996 Tour in Japan 
Tokyo '96 was recorded on March 30 during a tour in Japan where, according to www.keithjarrett.org, Jarrett's "Standard trio" performed 10 times in 16 days.

 March 20 - Public Hall, Shibuya
 March 22 - Sunpalace Hall, Fukuoka
 March 25 - Festival Hall, Osaka
 March 26 - Kaikan Hall 1, Kyoto
 March 28 - Arts Center, Aichi
 March 30 - Orchard Hall, Bunkamura, Tokyo 
 April 1 - Orchard Hall, Bunkamura, Tokyo
 April 2 - Orchard Hall, Bunkamura, Tokyo
 April 4 - Arts Theater, Saitama
 April 5 - Kanagawa Kenmin Hall, Yokohama

Reception
The Allmusic review by Richard S. Ginell awarded the album 4½ stars and states, "the standards trio lives up to its formidable track record of consistency and then some. Jarrett and perennial cohorts Gary Peacock and Jack DeJohnette are, if anything, even sharper, swinging harder and more attuned to each other than ever".

In November 1998 All About Jazz review by Christopher Hoard noted:

The authors of The Penguin Guide to Jazz wrote: "The story continues, unstaunchable, maddeningly indulgent and selflessly brilliant by turns. There are moments of pure genius here..."

Track listing 
 "It Could Happen to You" (Johnny Burke, Jimmy Van Heusen) - 11:38  
 "Never Let Me Go" (Ray Evans, Jay Livingston) - 7:02  
 "Billie's Bounce" (Charlie Parker) - 8:07  
 "Summer Night" (Al Dubin, Harry Warren) - 7:37  
 "I'll Remember April" (Gene de Paul, Patricia Johnston, Don Raye) - 10:20  
 "Mona Lisa" (Evans, Livingston) - 3:16  
 "Autumn Leaves" (Joseph Kosma, Johnny Mercer, Jacques Prévert) - 7:58  
 "Last Night When We Were Young/Caribbean Sky" (Harold Arlen, Yip Harburg/Keith Jarrett) - 9:55  
 "John's Abbey" (Bud Powell) - 5:50  
 "My Funny Valentine/Song" (Lorenz Hart, Richard Rodgers/Jarrett) - 7:16

Personnel 
 Keith Jarrett – piano
 Gary Peacock - bass
 Jack DeJohnette - drums

Production
 Manfred Eicher - producer
 Toshio Yamanaka - recording engineer
 Kuni Shinuhara - photography
 Michael Hofstetter - cover design

References 

Gary Peacock live albums
Jack DeJohnette live albums
Standards Trio albums
Keith Jarrett live albums
1996 live albums
ECM Records live albums
Albums produced by Manfred Eicher